John Hilton (the elder) (15651609(?)) was an English countertenor, organist and composer of mainly sacred works.

Works
Hilton is best known for his anthems "Lord, for Thy Tender Mercy's Sake" (which may actually be by one of the Farrants) and "Call to Remembrance".

Life
Hilton was born in 1565. By 1584 he was a countertenor at Lincoln Cathedral. At the start of 1594 he became organist at Trinity College, Cambridge.

He was the father of John Hilton the younger, also a composer, which makes definitive assignation of their combined sacred works problematic; whereas his only secular work appears to have been the madrigal Fair Oriana, beauty's Queen, which he wrote for The Triumphs of Oriana.

He died, probably in Cambridge, prior to 20 March 1609.

References 

Renaissance composers
English classical composers
16th-century English composers
17th-century English composers
1565 births
1609 deaths
English male classical composers
17th-century male musicians